{{DISPLAYTITLE:C3H6}}
The molecular formula C3H6 (molar mass: 42.08 g/mol, exact mass: 42.0470 u) may refer to:

 Cyclopropane
 Propene, also known as propylene or methyl ethylene